Pomaretto (French: Pomaret) is a comune (municipality) in the Metropolitan City of Turin in the Italian region Piedmont, located about 45 km southwest of Turin in the Valle Germanasca.

People
Paolo Ferrero

References

Cities and towns in Piedmont